The Anne Frank House is a writer's house and biographical museum dedicated to Jewish wartime diarist Anne Frank. The building is located on a canal called the Prinsengracht, close to the Westerkerk, in central Amsterdam in the Netherlands.

During World War II, Anne Frank hid from Nazi persecution with her family and four other people in hidden rooms, in the rear building, of the 17th-century canal house, later known as the Secret Annex. She did not survive the war but her wartime diary was published in 1947. Ten years later the Anne Frank Foundation was established to protect the property from developers who wanted to demolish the block.

The museum opened on 3 May 1960. It preserves the hiding place, has a permanent exhibition on the life and times of Anne Frank, and has an exhibition space about all forms of persecution and discrimination. In 2013 and 2014, the museum had 1.2 million visitors and was the 3rd most visited museum in the Netherlands, after the Rijksmuseum and Van Gogh Museum.

Building history

Canal house 

{{external media
| float  =
| width  =
| topic  =  The Twentieth Century
| caption =  
| headerimage= 
| title  = 
| image1 = Otto Frank at bookcase with Daniel Schorr<ref name="jhsnj-archives.org">{{cite news |title=Who Killed Anne Frank? |url=https://jhsnj-archives.org/?a=d&d=A19641211-NewJerseyJewishNews-19641211-01.1.40 |access-date=22 January 2022 |work=New Jersey Jewish News |agency=Jewish Historical Society of New Jersey |date=December 11, 1964 |page=40 |quote=“Who Killed Anne Frank? will be presented on The Twentieth Century Sunday at 6 P.M. on CBSTV. 'The series is sponsored by The Prudential Insurance Co.}}</ref>

}}

The house – and the one next door at number 265, which was later purchased by the museum – was built by Dirk van Delft in 1635. The canal-side façade dates from a renovation of 1740, when the rear annex was demolished. It was a private residence until the nineteenth century - in 1821, for instance, a Captain Johannes Christiaan van den Bergh, plaats-majoor der tweede klasse (adjutant third class) resided there.

Subsequently, the building became a warehouse, and the front warehouse with its wide stable-like doors was used to house horses. At the start of the 20th century, a manufacturer of household appliances occupied the building, succeeded in 1930 by a producer of piano rolls, who vacated the property by 1939.

 World War II 
On 1 December 1940, Anne's father, Otto Frank, moved the offices of the spice and gelling companies he worked for, Opekta and Pectacon, from an address on Singel canal to Prinsengracht 263.

The ground floor consisted of three sections; the front was the goods and dispatch entrance, behind it in the middle section were the spice mills, and at the rear, which was the ground floor of the annex, was the warehouse where the goods were packed for distribution. Directly above the ground floor were the offices of Frank's employees, with Miep Gies, Bep Voskuijl (known in the early version of The Diary of a Young Girl as Elli Vossen) and Johannes Kleiman occupying the front office while Victor Kugler worked in the middle office. The rear office held a large radio that the people in hiding used until 1943, after which the radio was handed in by the employees when the Nazis began confiscating Dutch radios.

The Achterhuis (Dutch for "back house") or Secret Annex – as it was called in The Diary of a Young Girl, an English translation of the diary – is the rear extension of the building. It was concealed from view by houses on all four sides of a quadrangle. Its secluded position made it an ideal hiding place for Otto Frank, his wife Edith, two daughters, Margot and Anne, of whom Anne was the younger, and four other Jews seeking refuge from Nazi persecution. They remained hidden here for two years and one month until they were raided by the Nazi authorities, arrested, and deported to their deaths in concentration and death camps. Of the hidden group, only Otto Frank survived the camps.

After those in hiding were arrested, the hiding place was cleared by order of the arresting officers and all the remaining contents (clothes, furniture, and personal belongings) of the Frank family and their friends were seized and distributed to bombed-out families in Germany. Before the building was cleared, Miep Gies and Bep Voskuijl, who had helped hide the families, returned to the hiding place against the orders of the Dutch police and rescued some personal effects. Amongst the items they retrieved were books and papers that would eventually be compiled into The Diary of Anne Frank.

 Publication of the diary 
After Otto Frank returned to Amsterdam in June 1945, he was given Anne's diaries and papers and subsequently compiled the two versions of his daughter's diaries into a book published in Dutch in 1947 under the title Het Achterhuis, which Anne had chosen as the name of a future memoir or novel based on her experiences in hiding. Achterhuis is a Dutch architectural term referring to a back-house (used comparatively with voorhuis meaning front-house). However, when the English translation began production, it was realised that many English-speaking readers might not be familiar with the term and it was decided that a more evocative term (the 'Secret Annexe') would better convey the building's hidden position. Otto Frank's contributions to the diary were such that he is recognized as a co-author.

 Museum history 

Shortly after the book was published, visitors were shown around by the employees who had hidden the families and could see the secret rooms. However, by 1955, the company had moved to new premises and the entire block to which the building belonged was sold to a single estate agent who served a demolition order with the intention of building a factory on the space. A campaign to save the building and to list it as a protected monument was started by the Dutch paper Het Vrije Volk on 23 November 1955. The building was saved by campaigners who staged a protest outside the building on the day of demolition.

The Anne Frank Foundation was established on 3 May 1957 in cooperation with Otto Frank, Anne Frank's father, with the primary aim of collecting enough funds to purchase and restore the building. In October of that year, the company who owned it donated the building to the Foundation as a goodwill gesture. The collected funds were then used to purchase the house next door, Number 265, shortly before the remaining buildings on the block were pulled down as planned. The building was opened as a museum to the public in 1960.

The former hiding place of Anne Frank attracted a huge amount of interest, especially as translations and dramatisations of the Diary had made her a figure known throughout the world. Over 9,000 visitors came in its first year. In a decade, there were twice as many. Over the years, the building has had to be renovated to manage such a large number of visitors, and it closed temporarily for this reason in 1970 and 1999.

On 9 September 2001, Queen Beatrix of the Netherlands reopened the museum, which now incorporated the entire building between exhibition spaces, a bookshop and a cafe, and featured the offices in the front house reconstructed to their state in the 1940s. In 2007, over one million people visited the museum.

On display at the museum is the Academy Award that Shelley Winters won, and later donated to the museum, for her performance as Petronella van Daan in the 1959 film The Diary of Anne Frank''. The award now sits in a bullet-proof glass case in the museum.

In 1998, the Anne Frank Zentrum in Berlin was opened after the completion of a cooperation agreement with the Anne Frank House.

Administration 

Ronald Leopold has been executive director of the museum since 2011 and Garance Reus-Deelder has been managing director since 2012.

The museum had 1,152,888 visitors in 2012, 1,195,456 visitors in 2013, and 1,227,462 visitors in 2014. It was the 3rd most visited museum in the Netherlands in 2013 and 2014, after the Rijksmuseum and Van Gogh Museum.

The museum is a member of the Museumvereniging (Museum Association).

See also 

Anne Frank tree
Anne Frank Educational Centre
Anne Frank Zentrum

References

External links

  of Anne Frank House

Anne Frank
Frank, Anne
Literary museums in the Netherlands
Historic house museums in the Netherlands
Holocaust museums
Houses completed in 1635
Museums established in 1960
Museums in Amsterdam
Rijksmonuments in Amsterdam
The Holocaust in the Netherlands
World War II museums in the Netherlands